The Huangdeng Dam is a gravity dam recently completed on the Lancang (Mekong) River in Lanping Bai and Pumi Autonomous County of Yunnan Province, China. The fact that work on the dam was begun without formal approval from the central government was a subject of some controversy. 

Construction on the dam began in 2010 and its 1,900 MW hydroelectric power station was initially planned to be operational in 2016, with the entire project complete in 2018. The first unit was put into operation in July 2018 and the dam was fully commissioned in January 2019.

See also

Hydropower in the Mekong River Basin
List of tallest dams in the world
List of dams and reservoirs in China
List of tallest dams in China

References

Dams in China
Dams in the Mekong River Basin
Gravity dams
Hydroelectric power stations in Yunnan
Buildings and structures in Nujiang Lisu Autonomous Prefecture
Roller-compacted concrete dams
China Huaneng Group